Ron Waller (February 14, 1933 – December 16, 2018) was an American football player and coach.  He played in the National Football League (NFL) as a running back for the Los Angeles Rams from 1955 through 1958 and for the American Football League's Los Angeles Chargers in 1960. He was the interim head coach of the NFL's San Diego Chargers for the final six games of the 1973 season, and held the same position with the Philadelphia Bell of the World Football League (WFL) in 1974. Waller was also the head coach of the Wilmington Clippers and the Norfolk Neptunes of the Atlantic Coast Football League. 

Prior to his professional career, Waller played for Laurel High School in Laurel, Delaware and the University of Maryland, College Park.  He was inducted into the Delaware Sports Museum and Hall of Fame in 1977. Waller died in Delaware on December 16, 2018 at the age of 85.

See also
 List of American Football League players

References

1933 births
2018 deaths
American football running backs
Los Angeles Chargers players
Los Angeles Rams players
Maryland Terrapins football players
Philadelphia Bell coaches
San Diego Chargers coaches
Western Conference Pro Bowl players
People from Laurel, Delaware
People from St. Johns County, Florida
Players of American  football from Delaware
Players of American football from Florida
San Diego Chargers head coaches